|}

The Tattersalls Gold Cup is a Group 1 flat horse race in Ireland open to thoroughbreds aged four years or older. It is run at the Curragh over a distance of 1 mile, 2 furlongs and 110 yards (2,112 metres), and it is scheduled to take place each year in May.

History
The event was established in 1962, and it was originally called the Ballymoss Stakes. It was named in honour of Ballymoss, a successful Irish-trained racehorse in the late 1950s. The first two runnings were held at Limerick Junction over 1 mile and 3½ furlongs (1962) and 1 mile and 4 furlongs (1963). During the early part of its history it was open to horses aged three or older.

The race was renamed the Rogers Gold Cup in 1984, and the minimum age was raised to four in 1985. Under the sponsorship of Tattersalls it became known as the Tattersalls Rogers Gold Cup, and this was shortened to the present title in 1993. For a period the event held Group 2 status, and it was promoted to Group 1 level in 1999.

Records
Most successful horse (2 wins):
 Yankee Gold – 1976, 1977
 So You Think - 2011, 2012
 Al Kazeem - 2013, 2015 
 Magical - 2019, 2020

Leading jockey (6 wins):
 Michael Kinane – Cockney Lass (1987), Prince of Andros (1995), Definite Article (1996), Dance Design (1997), Montjeu (2000), Black Sam Bellamy (2003)

Leading trainer (9 wins):
 Aidan O'Brien – Black Sam Bellamy (2003), Powerscourt (2004), Duke of Marmalade (2008), Fame and Glory (2010), So You Think (2011, 2012), Lancaster Bomber (2018), Magical (2019, 2020)

Leading owner since 1980 (10 wins): (includes part ownership)
 Michael Tabor – Montjeu (2000), Black Sam Bellamy (2003), Hurricane Run (2006), Duke of Marmalade (2008), Fame and Glory (2010), So You Think (2011, 2012), Lancaster Bomber (2018), Magical (2019, 2020)

Winners since 1980

Earlier winners

 1962: T V
 1963: Nardoo
 1964: Glenrowan
 1965: Hardicanute
 1966: Radbrook
 1967: White Gloves
 1968: Candy Cane
 1969: Selko
 1970: Eucalyptus
 1971: Rarity
 1972: Assertive
 1973: Cavo Doro
 1974: Bog Road
 1975: Hurry Harriet
 1976: Yankee Gold
 1977: Yankee Gold
 1978: Exdirectory
 1979: Dickens Hill

See also
 List of Irish flat horse races
 Recurring sporting events established in 1962  – this race is included under its original title, Ballymoss Stakes.

References
 Paris-Turf:
 Racing Post:

 galopp-sieger.de – Tattersalls Gold Cup (ex Ballymoss Stakes).
 ifhaonline.org – International Federation of Horseracing Authorities – Tattersalls Gold Cup (2019).
 irishracinggreats.com – Tattersalls Gold Cup (Group 1).
 pedigreequery.com – Tattersalls Rogers Gold Cup – Curragh.

Flat races in Ireland
Curragh Racecourse
Open middle distance horse races
1962 establishments in Ireland